The 1969 All-SEC football team consists of American football players selected to the All-Southeastern Conference (SEC) chosen by various selectors for the 1969 NCAA University Division football season. Tennessee won the conference.

Offensive selections

Receivers 

 Sammy Milner, Miss. St. (AP-1, UPI)
 Carlos Alvarez, Florida  (AP-1, UPI)
 Floyd Franks, Ole Miss (AP-2)
 Terry Beasley, Auburn (AP-2)

Tight ends 

 Ken Delong, Tennessee (UPI)

Tackles 

 Bob Asher, Vanderbilt (AP-1, UPI)
 Mac Steen, Florida (AP-2, UPI)
 Danny Ford, Alabama (AP-1)
 Richard Cheek, Auburn (AP-2)

Guards 

 Al Samples, Alabama (AP-1, UPI)
 Chip Kell, Tennessee (College Football Hall of Fame)  (AP-1, UPI)
 Donnie Williams, Florida (AP-2)
 Skip Jernigan, Ole Miss (AP-2)

Centers 

 Tom Banks, Auburn (AP-1)
 Godfrey Zaunbrecher, LSU  (UPI)
 Mike Bevans, Tennessee (AP-2)

Quarterbacks 

 Archie Manning, Ole Miss (College Football Hall of Fame)  (AP-1, UPI)Commercial Appeal All South
 John Reaves, Florida (AP-1)
 Pat Sullivan, Auburn (College Football Hall of Fame)  (AP-2)

Running backs 

 Curt Watson, Tennessee (AP-1, UPI)
 Eddie Ray, LSU (AP-1)
 Tommy Durrance, Florida  (UPI)
 Johnny Musso, Alabama (AP-2)
 Connie Frederick, Auburn (AP-2)

Defensive selections

Ends 

 Hap Farber, Ole Miss  (AP-1, UPI-1) Commercial Appeal All South, Central Press Captain's All-American Team (CP-3)
 David Ghesquiere, Florida (AP-1)
 Dick Palmer, Kentucky (AP-2)
 Neal Dettmering, Auburn (AP-2)

Tackles 

 David Roller, Kentucky (AP-1, UPI [as E])
 Frank Yanossy, Tennessee (AP-2, UPI)
 David Campbell, Auburn (UPI)
 Buz Morrow, Ole Miss (AP-2)Commercial Appeal All South

Middle guard 

 Steve Greer, Georgia  (AP-1, UPI)

Linebackers 

 Steve Kiner, Tennessee (College Football Hall of Fame)  (AP-1, UPI)
 Mike Kolen, Auburn  (AP-1, UPI)
 George Bevan, LSU  (AP-1, UPI)
 Jack Reynolds, Tennessee (AP-1)
 Chip Wisdom, Georgia (AP-2)
 Joe Federspiel, Kentucky (AP-2)
 Larry Thomas, Ole Miss (AP-2)
 Bobby Strickland, Auburn (AP-2)

Backs 

 Buddy McClinton, Auburn  (AP-1, UPI)
 Tommy Casanova, LSU (College Football Hall of Fame) (AP-1, UPI)
 Glenn Cannon, Ole Miss (AP-1, UPI)Commercial Appeal All South
 Tim Priest, Tennessee (AP-2)
 Steve Tannen, Florida (AP-2) 
 Larry Willingham, Auburn (AP-2)

Special teams

Kicker 

 John Riley, Auburn (AP-1)
Mark Lumpkin, LSU (AP-2)

Punter 

 Spike Jones, Georgia (AP-1)
Julian Fagan, Ole Miss (AP-2)

Key

AP = Associated Press

UPI = United Press International.

Bold = Consensus first-team selection by both AP and UPI

See also
1969 College Football All-America Team

References

All-SEC
All-SEC football teams